Wilfred James Yates (5 November 1897–1981) was an English footballer who played in the Football League for Crewe Alexandra, Preston North End and Tranmere Rovers.

References

1897 births
1981 deaths
English footballers
Association football defenders
English Football League players
Southport F.C. players
Preston North End F.C. players
Crewe Alexandra F.C. players
Tranmere Rovers F.C. players
Mansfield Town F.C. players